Edmund Lonsdale (31 October 1843 – 4 October 1913) was an Australian politician. Born in Morpeth, New South Wales, he was schooled in Maitland before becoming a bricklayer, builder and contractor. He was also an alderman on Armidale Shire Council.

Multi-member electorates were abolished for the 1894 election and Lonsdale was the Free Trade candidate for Armidale, however he was unsuccessful. He stood again at the Armidale and was elected with 50.4% of the vote. He only held the seat for one term, defeated by Charles Wilson at the 1898 election , with 43.7% of the vote.

Lonsdale was unsuccessful at the 1901 federal election for the seat of New England, but then returned to the Legislative Assembly, defeating Wilson at the 1901 state election, with 50.8% of the vote. He resigned in 1903 to successfully contest New England at the 1903 federal election. He only held the seat for one term, defeated  at the 1906 federal election Lonsdale again then returned to the Legislative Assembly at the 1907 state election, with 52.0% of the vote, holding the seat at the 1910 state election, with 51.3% of the vote,

Wilson died in office in 1913 aged 69.

References 

Free Trade Party members of the Parliament of Australia
Commonwealth Liberal Party politicians
Members of the Australian House of Representatives for New England
Members of the Australian House of Representatives
Members of the New South Wales Legislative Assembly
1843 births
1913 deaths
People from Maitland, New South Wales
Australian builders
20th-century Australian politicians